Zdenek Konvalina (born 1979) is a multidisciplinary artist who gained international acclaim as a performing artist and in later career developed abstract expressionist painting practice.

Personal life
Konvalina was born in 1979 in Brno, Czech Republic. He married ballerina Ksenia Ovsyanick in 2014.

Career
After graduating from  Brno Conservatory (Bachelor's degree: Fine Arts) in 1997 Zdenek pursued a career of a ballet dancer becoming an International Guest Principal Artist working with the most prominent choreographers, directors and artists around the world. In 2001, he joined the Houston Ballet where he danced until 2006. After dancing for five years as a principal dancer with the National Ballet of Canada, in 2011, he joined the English National Ballet in London as lead principal.

Konvalina performed with Dutch National Ballet, Hamburg Ballet, Munich Bayerische Staats Oper, Slovak National Theatre, Ballet Concerto de Puerto Rico, National Ballet of Cuba, Tokyo Ballet, Segerstrom Centre for the Arts |Los Angeles|, City Centre |New York|, Alexandrinsky and Mikhailovsky Theatres in St Peterburg, Kennedy Centre for Performing Arts in Washington.

He appeared in many important Gala performances such as Gala des Etoiles in Montreal, Gala performance Homage aux Stravinsky, Stars of 21st Century Gala, International Ballet Star Galas in Taipei and Singapore, Diaghilev Festival and Dance Open Festivals in St. Petersburg, Nijinsky Gala in Hamburg and in prestigious World Ballet Festival in Tokyo in 2006 and 2009.

In 2010  Zdenek co-created a full evening ballet, including creating a set design, for Maggio Musicale festival in Florence.

Always interested in other art forms and discovering new ways to express himself, Zdenek started his painting during his time in Houston |2002-2006|. Painting quickly took prominent place in his practice and he maintained a studio ever since. His works has been shown in several exhibitions in Houston, Toronto, Montreal and London and his works are placed in private collections in America, Canada and UK.

In 2014 Zdenek retired as a ballet dancer fully transitioning his practice to painting, now living and working in London.

Awards
Konvalina's awards include the gold medal at the Helsinki International Ballet Competition in 2001, Rolex Award Toronto 2008 and UK National Dance Award 2012.

References

Czech male ballet dancers
English National Ballet principal dancers
Living people
1979 births
Artists from Brno
Date of birth missing (living people)
Brno Conservatory alumni